Ruth-Anne Cunningham (born 2 April 1986), known professionally as RuthAnne, is an Irish singer-songwriter. She is best known for co-writing "Too Little Too Late", performed by the US singer JoJo, "In the Name of Love" performed by Martin Garrix and Bebe Rexha, "Work Bitch" performed by Britney Spears, "Slow Hands" performed by Niall Horan, "Where Do Broken Hearts Go", "No Control" performed by One Direction and "Beautiful World" performed by Westlife. She also wrote and vocally features on the Fifty Shades Darker soundtrack with her song "Pray". In 2013, she also has uncredited vocals for the EDM-oriented song, "All You Need is Love", on Swedish DJ Avicii's True album.

On 23 March 2018, Cunningham released her own first single "The Vow". Cunningham's debut album Matters of the Heart was released on 4 October  2019.

Early life 
Cunningham is from Donaghmede, Ireland. She has been signed to Sony ATV since May 2010 as a songwriter and producer. Her interest in performing began at the age of 7, when she participated in a karaoke contest. At age 12, Cunningham enrolled in the Billy Barry Stage School, and had formed a girl band by age 16.

Music career 

When Cunningham was 17, Eamonn Maguire, her manager at the time, brought her to the U.S. where she co-wrote JoJo's hit single "Too Little Too Late" with Billy Steinberg and Josh Alexander. It went from number 66 to number 3 on the US Billboard Hot 100 chart in just one week. She was awarded the ASCAP Songwriters Best Pop Award at the 24th Annual ASCAP Awards in 2007 for "Too Little Too Late."

In 2016, Cunningham contributed lead vocals to five tracks on the Goldroom album "West of the West", including "Back to You", "Teenage Waste", "Underwater", "Retrograde" and "Missing You Lately". 

In 2018, she won two more ASCAP awards for global hits "Slow Hands" by Niall Horan and "In the Name of Love" by Martin Garrix and Bebe Rexha.

On 13 July 2018, Cunningham supported Canadian singer Alanis Morissette at the Eventim Apollo in Hammersmith, London on her international tour.

On 17 December, she performed in her hometown Dublin at the Olympia Theatre supporting another Irish artist, Hozier.

In the year of 2020, Cunningham was part of an Irish collective of female singers and musicians called Irish Women in Harmony, that recorded a version of the song "Dreams" in aid of the charity Safe Ireland, which deals with domestic abuse which had reportedly risen significantly during the COVID-19 lockdown.

Awards 
She won an ASCAP Pop Award in 2007 for "Too Little Too Late."

Discography

Singles

As lead artist

As featured artist

References

External links 
 Ruth-Anne Cunningham, IMRO Magazine, 18.12.2007
 

Living people
Irish women singer-songwriters
1988 births
21st-century Irish singers